Swartz is a census-designated place (CDP) in Ouachita Parish in northeastern Louisiana, United States. The population was 4,536 in the 2010 census, an increase of 289 or 6.8 percent over the 2000 population. It is part of the Monroe Metropolitan Statistical Area.

Geography

Swartz is located at  (32.566128, -91.991557).

Demographics

2020 census

As of the 2020 United States census, there were 4,354 people, 1,523 households, and 1,073 families residing in the CDP.

2000 census
As of the census of 2000, there were 4,247 people, 1,557 households, and 1,250 families residing in the CDP. The racial makeup of the CDP was 91.10% White, 6.80% African American, 0.40% Native American, 0.47% Asian, 0.78% from other races, and 0.45% from two or more races. Hispanic or Latino of any race were 1.62% of the population.

There were 1,557 households, out of which 41.6% had children under the age of 18 living with them, 66.5% were married couples living together, 10.6% had a female householder with no husband present, and 19.7% were non-families. 16.5% of all households were made up of individuals, and 5.0% had someone living alone who was 65 years of age or older. The average household size was 2.73 and the average family size was 3.06.

In the CDP, the population was spread out, with 28.1% under the age of 18, 10.8% from 18 to 24, 30.9% from 25 to 44, 21.9% from 45 to 64, and 8.4% who were 65 years of age or older. The median age was 32 years. For every 100 females, there were 93.9 males. For every 100 females age 18 and over, there were 89.9 males.

The median income for a household in the CDP was $42,645, and the median income for a family was $50,682. Males had a median income of $32,006 versus $25,305 for females. The per capita income for the CDP was $17,058. About 5.9% of families and 8.3% of the population were below the poverty line, including 9.8% of those under age 18 and 10.5% of those age 65 or over.

Notable People
Swartz is the residence of Vance McAllister, the former Republican U.S. Representative from Louisiana's 5th congressional district and a Monroe-area businessman.

Swartz, Louisiana is the former residence of Rodney H Stoffer, musician, sketch artist, guitarist for Dallas, Texas based psychedelic rock band, The Mammal Virus.

References

Census-designated places in Louisiana
Census-designated places in Ouachita Parish, Louisiana
Census-designated places in Monroe, Louisiana metropolitan area